A Regional Planning Organization is a government body that guides the development of public and private resources in a manner that ensures public safety, well being and livability. Regional planning organizations take different forms and may also include a metropolitan planning organization or may be part of a multi-state or multi-government association. A regional planning organization develops plans that coordinate planning by groups of local governments and special districts that have common social, political, economic, cultural or other similarities. Generally this process takes the form of urban planning or one of its sub-disciplines such as land use planning, transportation planning, or environmental planning.

Regional planning organizations exist in a variety of different formats. In some areas they are a part of another organizations such as a Regional Council of Governments. Regional planning organizations are sometimes also called regional development organisations as the need for planning often includes key economic development issues.

See also
Metropolitan planning organization
Regional Planning Councils (RPCs), a quasi-governmental body established by the state of Florida
Regional Development Commissions (RDC), a regional government in the state of Minnesota
Urban planning
Regional planning

External links
 National Association of Development Organizations

References

Urban planning
Regional science